The Vanil des Cours (1,562) is a mountain of the Swiss Prealps, overlooking the Lake of Gruyère in the canton of Fribourg. It lies in the group culminating at La Berra.

References

External links
 Vanil des Cours on Hikr

Mountains of the Alps
Mountains of Switzerland
Mountains of the canton of Fribourg
One-thousanders of Switzerland